Nueva California may refer to:
 Alta California, a historical region of North America
 Nueva California, Chiriquí, Panama